H. N. Nanje Gowda (born 12 February 1935 in Hanyalu Village, Hassan District - died 19 December 2008 in Bangalore, Karnataka)  was an Indian politician from Karnataka.

He was a member of the Praja Socialist Party, then the Swatantra Party, then the Indian National Congress, then the Bharatiya Janata Party, then the Janata Dal (United) and finally the Janata Dal (Secular).

Nanje Gowda was a member of the Lok Sabha for two terms from Hassan constituency from 1980 to 1989 and was also Minister for Irrigation in the D. Devaraj Urs Ministry.

Nanje Gowda was a member of the Karnataka Legislative Assembly from the Arkalgud constituency which he won Swatantra Party ticket from 1967 to 1971 and Basavanagudi constituency in 1994 to 1999 on Bharatiya Janata Party ticket.

References

External links 

 8th Lok Sabha Members Bioprofile

People from Hassan district
Bharatiya Janata Party politicians from Karnataka
Swatantra Party politicians
Praja Socialist Party politicians
Janata Dal (Secular) politicians
Indian National Congress politicians from Karnataka
Janata Dal (United) politicians
Lok Sabha members from Karnataka
India MPs 1980–1984
India MPs 1984–1989
Mysore MLAs 1967–1972
1935 births
2008 deaths
Karnataka politicians
Karnataka MLAs 1994–1999